Jean Robotham (born 13 December 1943) is a Costa Rican sprinter. She competed in the women's 400 metres at the 1968 Summer Olympics. She was the first woman to represent Costa Rica at the Olympics.

References

1943 births
Living people
Athletes (track and field) at the 1968 Summer Olympics
Costa Rican female sprinters
Costa Rican female long jumpers
Costa Rican pentathletes
Olympic athletes of Costa Rica
Place of birth missing (living people)